Pillow Talk is a Canadian TV series, which premiered on Crave on February 10, 2022. A sketch comedy series about adult relationships, the series centres on four couples (three heterosexual and one gay) and a pair of platonic roommates, each exploring comedic interpersonal situations through conversations taking place almost entirely in their bedrooms. Despite being set in bedrooms, however, the conversations are not necessarily always sexual in nature, but simply reflect the fact that couples often discuss or argue about almost any aspect of their lives in that part of their home.

The series is an adaptation of Entre deux draps ("Between Two Sheets"), a French-language series which premiered in January 2021 on Noovo.

Entre deux draps
Entre deux draps premiered on Noovo in January 2021, as one of the network's first new original scripted programs since its acquisition by Bell Media. The cast includes Pier-Luc Funk and Virginie Ranger-Beauregard as Antoine and Lydia; François Papineau and Bénédicte Décary as Luc and Marie-Ève; Guillaume Girard and Karine Gonthier-Hyndman as Marco and Virginie; Simon Pigeon and Antoine Pilon as Jean-Pascal and Simon; and Fayolle Jean Jr. and Mathieu Pepper as roommates Valère and Thomas. Due to the COVID-19 pandemic in Quebec, the producers primarily cast actors who already live together as couples or roommates in real life, so that the series could be filmed without violating social distancing restrictions; producer Louis Morissette noted that the casting of roommates Simon Pigeon and Antoine Pilon as the gay couple took place only after the show was unsuccessful in finding a real gay actor couple who were willing to be fully out on camera. Gonthier-Hyndman also later clarified in an interview that she and Girard were no longer still together as a couple.

Florence Pilote, the daughter of actress Mélissa Désormeaux-Poulin, also has a supporting role in the series as the young daughter of Marco and Virginie, and Micheline Bernard and Martin Drainville have supporting roles as Thomas's parents, whom the producers have announced will be given more prominent roles in the second season.

The series was compared in the media to an updated version of the 1990s Quebec television series Un gars, une fille.

In June 2021, at the same time as the English adaptation Pillow Talk was announced, Noovo announced the renewal of Entre deux draps for a second season.

Pillow Talk
The English adaptation Pillow Talk was announced in June 2021, and went into production in August. The cast includes Adam DiMarco and Sydney Scotia as Andy and Lydia, Andrew Wheeler and Sharon Crandall as Luke and Mia, Nicola Correia-Damude and Carlos Gonzalez-Vio as Marco and Vicki, Paolo Santalucia and Gregory Prest as JP and Simon, and Chris Robinson and Kwasi Thomas as Virgil and Thomas. As in the original series, all five of the main duos in the series are played by actors who live together as couples or roommates in real life.

The series was produced by the same team behind the original Entre deux draps, and was shot on the same sets. Scripts were translated by Laurel Baker and Steve Galluccio, although a few Quebec-specific references in the script were changed to analogues more familiar to English Canadian audiences.

John Doyle of The Globe and Mail praised the series as "at times hilarious and at times deeply poignant", writing that "on the evidence of the early episodes, it's a delight."

The show's cast received an ensemble nomination for Best Performance in a Variety or Sketch Comedy Program or Series at the 11th Canadian Screen Awards in 2023.

Characters

References

External links

2022 Canadian television series debuts
2020s Canadian sketch comedy television series
2020s Canadian LGBT-related comedy television series
Crave original programming